Taranabant (codenamed MK-0364) is a  cannabinoid receptor type 1 (CB1) inverse agonist that was investigated as a potential treatment for obesity due to its anorectic effects. It was discovered by Merck & Co.

In October 2008, Merck has stopped its phase III clinical trials with the drugs due to high level of central nervous system side effects, mainly depression and anxiety.

See also 
 Cannabinoid receptor antagonist

References

Anorectics
Cannabinoids
CB1 receptor antagonists
Pyridines
Nitriles
Chlorobenzenes
Trifluoromethyl compounds
Carboxamides